Mahendra Veeren Nagamootoo (மகேந்திர வீரன் நாகமுத்து) (born October 9, 1975) is a former cricketer for Guyana and the West Indies and of Tamil Indo-Guyanese ethnicity.

In 2005, Nagamootoo took the most wickets (12) for Guyana, winning a regional 50-over title against Barbados at Bourda.

He and his brother have sponsored cricket tournaments in their hometown of Whim, Guyana. In 2019, he was inducted into the Berbice Cricket Board's hall of fame.

Family 
Nagamootoo is the nephew of both Rohan Kanhai and Alvin Kallicharan; two of the best ever West Indian batsmen of Indian descent. Nagamootoo has a brother Vishal, who plays cricket for Guyana.

He is the nephew of Moses Nagamootoo, a politician for the Alliance for Change party.

References 

1975 births
Living people
Guyanese cricketers
West Indies One Day International cricketers
West Indies Test cricketers
Guyana cricketers
Guyanese Hindus
Indo-Guyanese people
People from East Berbice-Corentyne